Kapil Dev Prasad is a weaver from Bihar, India. He is known for popularising the Buddhist art of weaving ‘bawan buti’ (52 motifs) on sarees, bedsheets and curtains.

Life and career
Kapil Dev Prasad was born in 1954. His family occupation involved the handloom. He comes from a small village named Basman Bigha village which is located 3 kilometres east-north of Nalanda district headquarters in Bihar.

In 2023, he was awarded the Padma Shri, the country's fourth highest honour.

References

Living people
Weavers
Artists from Bihar
Recipients of the Padma Shri in arts
1954 births
People from Nalanda district